Madapusi Raghavan Srinivasaprasad, usually known as  M. R. Srinivasaprasad (born in 1959 in Salem, Tamil Nadu) is a right-handed batsman and a right-arm off-spin bowler who played cricket for Karnataka Ranji in the Wills Trophy (1983/84 – 1987/88), and the Deodhar Trophy (1984/85). He represented Young India in Zimbabwe (1983/84). His first-class span was from 1979/80 to 1987/88 in which he scored 3031 runs over 53 matches.

He was part of the Managing Committee of KSCA since November 2010 to November 2013.

Career outside cricket
M.R.Srinivas Prasad is an Electronics Engineer with a management degree. He has held many leadership roles across various industries.  He is presently the CEO of Philips Innovation Campus, Bangalore.

 Manager - Alcatel Business Systems, Paris.
 General Manager, Head - Sony Software Development Center, Bangalore.
 Vice President - IT - Fidelity Investments, Bangalore.
 CEO @ Philips Innovation Campus, Bangalore.
 Board of Directors Philips HomeCo, India.
 Chairman, Philips India Provident fund and Gratuity Trust.
 Member of the Industry Advisory Board IIIT, Bangalore (Present)
 Member of CII National Committee of Technology and R&D (Present)

References

External links 
 CricketArchive Profile

1959 births
Living people
Indian cricketers
Karnataka cricketers
South Zone cricketers
People from Salem district